Fatima Ibrahim Didi or Princess Fatima Tuttu Goma (1918 – 5 February 2008) was a princess and politician from the Maldives. In 1953-4, she was the President of the senate in the Maldives.

Biography 
Didi was born in Malé. in 1918. Her mother was Princess Gulistan and her father was Al-Amir Ibrahim Fa'amuladeri Kilegefa'anu (Ekgamuge Ibrahim 'Ali Didi). Her grandfather was Muhammad Imaaduddeen VI.

She was offered the crown of the Maldives but refused it after hearing of objections from the clergy.

From 1 January 1953, she was the President of the senate in the Maldives in the new republic whilst her father was Prime Minister. She stood down when the Sultanate was reintroduced in March 1954.

She married H.E. Ahmad Zaki, who held senior diplomatic roles for his country.

Didi died in Indira Gandhi Memorial Hospital in Malé in 2008,

References

1918 births
2008 deaths
People from Malé
Maldivian women in politics
Maldivian nobility
Princesses
20th-century women politicians